Laodicea may refer to:

Places

Turkey
Laodicea on the Lycus, in Phrygia
Laodicea Pontica, in the Pontus
Laodicea Combusta, in Pisidia

Syria
 Laodicea ad Libanum, near Homs
 Laodicea ad Mare, the present city of Latakia

Other countries
 Laodicea (Arcadia), in Greece
 Laodicea (Mesopotamia), in Iraq
 Laodicea in Media, former name of Nahavand, Iran
 Laodicea in Phoenicia, former name of Beirut, Lebanon

Biology

 Laodicea (cnidarian), a genus of hydrozoans in the suborder Conica

See also 
 Laodicean Church, early Christians in Laodicea on the Lycus
 Epistle to the Laodiceans, an apocryphal epistle attributed to Paul the Apostle
 Council of Laodicea, a synod held about 363–364 CE
 A Laodicean, an 1881 novel by Thomas Hardy
 Laodice (disambiguation)
 Ladoceia, a town of ancient Arcadia, Greece